Chandrawal, also spelled Chandraval, is a village in Sarojaninagar block of Lucknow district, Uttar Pradesh, India. As of 2011, its population was 2,057, in 341 households. It is the seat of a gram panchayat.

References 

Villages in Lucknow district